Al-Qasim al-Ma'mun ibn Hammud was an Arab Caliph of Córdoba in Muslim Spain for two periods, 1018 to 1021, and again for a short time in 1023. He hailed from the Banu Khazraj tribe.

This was during a short period when the caliphate was held by the Hammudid dynasty.

References

Hammudid caliphs of Córdoba
11th-century caliphs of Córdoba
11th-century Arabs
Year of birth unknown
Place of birth unknown
11th-century deaths